Moly may refer to:

 Moly (herb), a magic herb in Greek mythology
 Allium moly, a flowering plant
 Molybdenum (Mo), a chemical element
 Molybdenum disulfide, referred to as "moly" when used as a dry lubricant, or added to grease or oil

See also
 Chromoly, a steel chromium and molybdenum alloy
 Moli (disambiguation)
 Molly (disambiguation)